The 2008 Boise State Broncos football team represented Boise State University in the 2008 NCAA Division I FBS football season. The Broncos played their home games at Bronco Stadium, most famous for its blue artificial turf surface, often referred to as the "smurf-turf". The blue turf was new for the 2008 season, as the old Astroplay surface was replaced by Field Turf. The Broncos won the Western Athletic Conference championship and were one of only two teams (the other being the Utah Utes) to finish the 2008 regular season with an undefeated record. However, the Broncos were unable to finish the season undefeated after losing 17–16 to #11 TCU in the Poinsettia Bowl.

Previous season

The Broncos entered the 2007 season ranked #23 in the coaches poll and were on a 13-game winning streak after going undefeated in 2006. After an opening home win against Weber State to extend their winning streak to 14, the Broncos traveled to Seattle to play Washington. The Broncos failed to win against a Pac-10 team, losing to the Huskies 24–10, ending their nation's best winning streak, and dropping out of the top 25. The Broncos would win 9 straight games from September 15 to November 17, including 7 WAC games and wins over rivals Fresno State, Idaho, and Nevada in a 4 OT game that set a new NCAA FBS record for points scored with 136 (69–67; that record total was matched later that season when Navy beat North Texas 74–62). The Broncos reentered the top 25 on November 3 and made it as high as #15 before dropping to #17 for the season ending game at #13 and undefeated Hawaii. The game with Hawaii was for the outright WAC championship, won by Hawaii 39–27. The Broncos would return to Honolulu to play East Carolina in the Sheraton Hawaii Bowl on December 23, won by East Carolina 41–38. The Broncos would finish the season 10–3, but failed to win either a conference championship or a bowl game for the first time since 2001.

Pre-season

Pre-season awards 
On July 25, the Broncos were selected as the favorite to win the WAC by the media by a total of 383 points to 379 for Fresno State and first place votes of 25 to 20. The WAC coaches (not allowed to vote for their own team) voted Fresno #1 with a total of 63 to 57 points. Fresno had a total of 7 first place votes among WAC coaches to Boise States 2.

The USA Today Coaches preseason top 25 poll was released on August 1, with Boise State receiving 25 votes to rank 34th.

The Associated Press preseason top 25 poll was released on August 16, with Boise State receiving 17 votes to rank 36th.

Schedule

Game summaries

Idaho State
23-6 all time, last meeting 2003 (62-0 in Boise)
The Broncos opened the 2008 season with a 49-7 win over their former in-state rival Idaho State in front of a new Bronco Stadium record crowd of 32,318. Freshman quarterback Kellen Moore completed 14 of 19 passes for 274 and 2 Touchdowns (80, 56) in his first collegiate start. Ian Johnson rushed 14 times for 87 yards and one score while Titus Young made 7 receptions for 142 yards and one touchdown and also one rushing touchdown. Richie Brockel rushed for two touchdowns and Tyler Shoemaker caught two TD passes. The two touchdowns by Young, Brockel and Shoemaker marks the first time three Bronco's had each scored two touchdowns in one game. The Broncos out gained the Bengals 582 to 207 in total yards. The Broncos also blocked a Bengal punt in the 2nd quarter. With the win the Broncos moved their regular season home winning streak to 44. At one point in the fourth quarter, all 11 players on Defense for the Bronco's were freshman.

Bowling Green
1-0 all time, last meeting 2005 (48-20 in Boise)

Another Bronco Stadium record crowd of 32,335 watched as Boise State raised their regular season home winning streak to 45 games by beating Bowling Green 20-7. The Broncos came out fast scoring 3 touchdowns in the first half. A much improved second half Bowling Green defense mixed with various mental mistakes by the Bronco offense left the Broncos scoreless in the second half.  Ian Johnson rushed 13 times for 97 yards and two touchdowns while quarterback Kellen Moore went 18 of 23 for 180, started the game 11 of 11, and rushed for his first career touchdown.  Kyle Brotzman set a Boise State record by making his 75th straight extra point, breaking the record held by Tyler Jones of 74 made in 2003 and 2004.  Safety Jeron Johnson had 13 tackles (8 solo), 1.5 tackles for loss, one pass break up and two second half fumble recoveries to win WAC defensive player of the week.

Oregon

First ever meeting

Since joining D1A (now FBS) in 1996, Boise State had lost all 13 of their road games against teams from BCS conferences. That streak ended with a 37-32 win over Oregon of the Pac-10 in front of 58,713 hostile fans in Autzen Stadium. The Broncos held leads of 24-6 at halftime and 37-13 in the 4th before Oregon closed out the game with 19 unanswered points. The Broncos were held to only 38 yards rushing, but were helped by the arm of Freshman quarterback Kellen Moore. Moore went 25-37 for 386 yards, 3 touchdowns and 1 interception. One touchdown pass went for 73 yards to Senior Vinny Perretta, his first TD of the season, before he left the game with a concussion. Junior Jeremy Childs added 4 receptions for 100 yards with a long of 41. Junior Kyle Wilson made 2 interceptions (totaling 3 on the season) while Sophomore Brandyn Thompson made his first career interception. Sophomore kicker Kyle Brotzman went 3-4 on field goals from 24, 36, and a career long 51 yards. Sophomore safety Jeron Johnson was ejected late in the 4th. The win propelled the Broncos into the top 25 in both major polls for the first time this season, being ranked 19th by the AP and 20th by the coaches in the USA Today poll. For his efforts, Kellen Moore was named the Walter Camp Football Foundation Bowl Subdivision National Offensive Player of the Week and the WAC Offensive Player of the Week. The Broncos were also named the Tostitos Fiesta Bowl National Team of the Week.

Louisiana Tech

6-4 all time, 6-1 as WAC members. Last year 45-31 in Ruston
Boise State won their WAC opener for the 8th straight year and extended their regular season home winning streak to 46 by defeating the Bulldogs of Louisiana Tech 38-3. Kellen Moore threw an interception on the opening drive, then was almost perfect finishing the game 20-28 for 325 and 2 TD's (13, 44) to Julian Hawkins and Chris O'niel, the latter on a reverse throw back to Moore from Vinny Perretta.  Moore's numbers were good enough to earn the WAC Offensive Player of the Week award for the second time this season. D.J. Harper added 2 TD's on 9 carries for 35 yards. Ian Johnson again had a subpar rushing game, 9 for 42, but had his first career 100 yard receiving game with 106 on 3 catches.  The Bronco defense has now given up 7 points or less in 3 of the 4 games this season. Kyle Brotzman hit a 49-yard field goal and averaged 57.7 yards on 3 punts including one downed at the 1-yard line and another of 72 yards. The Broncos moved up in the top 25 polls to #15 in the AP and #16 in the USA Today Coaches poll.

Southern Miss
1-0 all time, last meeting 2007 (38-16 in Boise)
The Bronco defense shined in holding the strong Southern Mississippi offense to just 278 yards, stops on 4 fourth down tries and forced 2 turnovers to help the Bronco offense that continues to struggle. The Bronco offense was great in the second quarter, scoring all of their 24 points, but a series of three and outs, penalties and other bad decisions led to just 113 yards and 6 first downs in the second half. The Broncos were held scoreless in the second half for the second time this season, but also held their opponent to 7 points or less for the fourth time in five games this season. Kellen Moore went 21 of 30 for 170, 3 TD's and 1 pick. 10 of his completions went to Jeremy Childs for 92 yards. Austin Pettis added 2 TD's on 4 catches for 30 yards. Jeron Johnson recorded his first interception of the season. Kyle Brotzman went 3 for 3 on PAT's, made a 32-yard field goal and averaged 39.7 yards on 6 punts that included 2 down inside the 20-yard line and a long of 63 in rout to being awarded the WAC Special Teams Player of the Week for the third time in his two-year career. Boise State remained the same in every major poll following the win. Prior to the game wide receiver Titus Young, who had previously been suspended for the Oregon game, was suspended indefinitely.

Hawaii

6-3 all time, 6-1 as WAC members. Last year 27-39 in Honolulu

The Broncos defense came up with 5 interceptions and 7 sacks in taking down the defending WAC champion Hawaii Warriors 27-7 in front of another record crowd of 32,342 in Bronco Stadium. Brandyn Thompson had 3 interceptions and 5 solo tackles (one for a loss) to be awarded the WAC Defensive Player of the Week. George Iloka and Jeron Johnson also made interceptions. This marked the 5th time this season the Bronco Defense held their opponent to 7 points or less and moved to 2nd in the nation in scoring defense giving up only 10.5 PPG. On offense, Kellen Moore went 25 of 33 for 256 and 3 TD's, 6 of his passes going to Vinny Perretta for 82 yards. Kyle Brotzman won the WAC Special Teams Player of the Week for the second straight week going 2 for 4 on field goals (31, 43), brought his school record for consecutive extra points to 90, and averaged 60 yards on 3 punts with a career long of 75 and 2 downed inside the 20. The Broncos have still never lost a home WAC game (26 straight) and have now won 47 straight regular season home games. The Broncos moved to #13 in all of the major polls and debuted at #12 in the first BCS rankings.

San Jose State

8-0 all time, 7-0 as WAC members. Last year 42-7 in Boise

The last two trips to San Jose for Boise State resulted in unsuccessful but scary close upset bids by the Spartans, both times the Broncos were undefeated. This game had the same ingredients and looked to be heading for a close finish being 20-16 in the third quarter, but the Broncos scored the game's final 13 points to stay undefeated and stop the Spartans chances of playing spoiler to the Broncos undefeated chances. Kellen Moore went 26 of 40 for 244 1 INT and 2 TD's to Jeremy Childs and Austin Pettis. Jeremy Avery rushed 21 times for 96 yards and Ian Johnson added 66 on 16 carries and 2 TD's to set a new career touchdown mark in Boise State history, now with 51. Along with his 5 receptions Jeremy Childs had a first quarter punt block that led to a Bronco Touchdown. Kyle Brotzman hit 2 field goals from 31 and 39. The win gives the Broncos sole possession of first place in the WAC and moved them to #11 in every major poll, including the BCS.

New Mexico State
8-0 all time, 3-0 as WAC members. Last year 58-0 in Boise.
New Mexico State quarterback Chase Holbrook, who entered the game averaging 295 yards a game, only managed 64 yards passing and his Aggies were shut out by Boise State for the second straight year. The Bronco defense held the Aggies to only 150 total yards, made 7 sacks, 1 INT by Kyle Wilson, forced one fumble and now have given up 7 points or less in 6 of 8 games this season and are now giving up just 9.88 points per game. Kyle Wilson also scored the Broncos first non offensive touchdown of the season by returning a fourth quarter punt 71 yards. On offense, Kellen Moore went 15 of 23 for 246, 1 INT and 3 TD's, 1 to Austin Pettis and 2 to Jeremy Childs. Ian Johnson had 10 carries for 61 yards and 1 TD to increase his school record to 52 TD's in his career. The Broncos moved to #9 in the AP Poll, their highest regular season ranking in school history, and moved to #10 in every other poll.

Utah State

10-4 all time, 3-0 as WAC members. Last year 52-0 in Logan
Four different Bronco players threw for a combined 5 TD's and 458 yards passing to collect  their 37th straight conference home win and remain undefeated on the season. Kellen Moore went 27 of 36 for 362, 2 TD's and 1 INT. Backup quarterback Mike Coughlin and wide receivers Tanyon Bissell and Vinny Perretta also added TD passes. Perretta added a 38-yard touchdown reception of his own to go along with 2 each by Jeremy Childs (57, 17) and Austin Pettis (7, 5). Ian Johnson's 1-yard TD run moved his school record for career rushing TD's to 53. The Bronco defense held the Aggie rushing attack to just 44 yards, forced 6 turnovers and scored their first TD of the season when Ellis Powers picked up a Ryan Winterswyk forced fumble and returned it 4 yards. George Iloka had 2 interceptions. The Bronocs are now ranked #9 in every major poll.

Idaho
19-17-1 all time, 3-0 as WAC members. Last year 58-14 in Boise
The Broncos knocked off their in-state rivals for the 10th straight year to retain the Governor's Trophy and secure their 6th WAC Championship in 7 years. The Vandals opened the game with an 81-yard TD on the first play of the game and it was all down hill from there. The Broncos ran over the Vandals to the tune of 525 yards, 315 of those on the ground. Jeremy Avery became the first Bronco back to go over 100 yards this season by gaining 156 yards on 11 carries, had a long of 57 for one of his two touchdowns and set a school record with 14.2 YPC. Ian Johnson added to his school record for rushing TD's which now stands at 54. Kellen Moore went 23 for 31 for 210 yards, 11 of those to Jeremy Childs for 99 yards and 6 to Austin Pettis for 71 yards. Kyle Wilson now leads the WAC with 5 interceptions and returned a punt 79 yards for his second return TD of the season. Ellis Powers return a fumble 45 yards for a TD, his second TD in as many weeks. True freshman defensive lineman Byron Hout, who made 5 solo tackles, 2 sacks and forced the fumble that led to the Powers TD, was named the WAC Defensive Player of the Week. The Broncos remained at #9 in every major poll.

Nevada

22-12 all time, 7-0 as WAC members. Last year 69-67 in 4 OT's in Boise. 
The Broncos held off a frenzy second half comeback by the Wolf Pack that ended when Colin Kaepernick's pass was batted down in the end zone on the last play of the game to secure the Broncos their 11th win of the season, their 5th season this decade with 11 wins or more, and the WAC championship for the 6th time in 7 years. The Broncos came out quick to lead Nevada 24-3 at halftime, but Kellen Moore threw 3 3rd quarter interceptions, 2 that were returned for touchdowns, and Nevada's offense scored on a 31-yard run to make it 31-24 at the end of 3. The Bronco's pushed their lead back to 17 on an Austin Pettis touchdown reception and a Kyle Brotzman 50-yard field goal. Nevada scored a TD with 4:36 left, recovered an on-side kick, kicked a FG with 2:36 left, and got the ball one last time with 1:37 left after a Brotzman missed 44-yard field goal but couldn't punch it in the end zone to force overtime. Kellen Moore went 29 of 48 for 414, a career-high, 3 TD's and the 3 costly INT's. Austin Pettis had 9 catches for 126 yards and 2 TD's (18, 10) to be named WAC Offensive Player of the Week while Vinny Perretta made 5 catches for 126 yards and a rushing TD. The Broncos only managed 70 yards rushing, 66 of those on an Ian Johnson TD run. The Broncos remained #9 in all major polls for the 3rd consecutive week.

Fresno State
6-4 all time, 6-1 as WAC members. Last year 34-21 in Fresno

The new record crowd of 32,412 rushed the field and fireworks went off above Bronco Stadium to celebrate the Broncos 3rd undefeated season in 5 years, their 5th 8-0 WAC season in the last 7 years, and their 7th straight year of being undefeated at home all to keep their slim BCS chances alive. Senior QB Bush Hamdan started on Senior day and threw 1 pass that was intercepted and returned for a touchdown by Fresno State. The Bulldogs would only manage 3 points the rest of the game. The Broncos started slow in the first half leading only 13-10 at the half but broke the game wide open with 4 TD's in the third. Jeremy Avery scored on a 43-yard rush, Kyle Wilson returned a punt 90 yards for his 3rd return score of the year, Julian Hawkins caught a 35-yard TD pass from WR Tayon Bissel on a reverse pass, and Kellen Moore found TE Tommy Gallarda for a 16-yard touchdown reception. Ian Johnson had a 69-yard run on the last play of the 3rd quarter and scored a TD to open the 4th. Johnson added another TD later in the 4th to tie Marshall Faulk for the WAC record for TD rushes in a career with 57. In all Johnson carried the ball 14 times for 128 and the 2 scores. Kellen Moore went 17 for 23 for 213 and 2 TD's. Kyle Wilson was named the WAC Special Teams Player of the Week. On December 7, the Broncos were selected to play #11 Texas Christian (10-2) in the San Diego County Credit Union Poinsettia Bowl on December 23.

Poinsettia Bowl - TCU

1-0 all time. Last meeting 2003 (34-31 in the Plains Capital Fort Worth Bowl)

Postseason awards

WAC Coach of the Year

Chris Petersen

WAC Freshman of the Year
Kellen Moore-QB

First Team All WAC
Jeremy Childs- Jr. WR- Second straight year on 1st team

Andrew Woodruff- Sr. OL

Ryan Winterswyk- So. DL

Ellis Powers-Sr. LB

Kyle Wilson- Jr. DB- 2007 2nd team

Second Team All WAC
Austin Pettis- So. WR

Kellen Moore- Fr. QB

Ian Johnson-Sr. RB- 2006 & 2007 1st team

Mike T. Williams- Sr. DL

Jeron Johnson- So. DB

Kyle Wilson- Jr. ST/KR

Rankings

Statistics

Team

Scores by quarter

Offense

Rushing

Passing

Receiving

Defense

Special teams

Expanded WAC Standings

Roster

References

Boise State
Boise State Broncos football seasons
Western Athletic Conference football champion seasons
Boise State Broncos football